"Make Em Say Uhh!" is the second single from Master P's 1997 studio album Ghetto D, produced by KLC.  The album was released in 1997, but the single was not released until January 1998 though Priority Records and Master P's No Limit Records. The song featured performers Fiend, Silkk The Shocker, Mia X and Mystikal. It reached #16 on the Billboard Hot 100, making it Master P's highest-charting single at the time (and later would tie with "I Got the Hook-Up!"). The single was certified Platinum by the RIAA.

Music video 
The music video, directed by Michael Martin, took place on a basketball court, with Master P, the other performers, and members of Master P's No Limit crew dancing and playing basketball. A gold tank is driven to the court, and performers dance on it. A gorilla mascot dunks a basketball and performs acrobatics. Featured in the video is an appearance from professional basketball player Shaquille O'Neal who is enthusiastic in the prowess of the performers.

Remix 
A remixed version of the song is featured on Master P's next album, MP da Last Don with all new verses from each artist from the original, with the exception of Mystikal's verse which was replaced with one from Snoop Dogg as well as an entirely new instrumental and ends with an explosion.

Charts

Weekly charts

Year-end charts

Certifications 

|}

References 

1998 singles
Master P songs
Silkk the Shocker songs
Mystikal songs
Posse cuts
1997 songs